Elizabeth Anne Fuller (born 24 June 1957) is the illustrator of many New Zealand children's books; including Mrs. Wishy-Washy, My Brown Bear Barney, Best-Loved Bear. She was born in Hastings, New Zealand, daughter to Geoffrey and Margaret Fuller. Elizabeth went to primary and secondary schools in Hawke's Bay before attending Wellington School of Design. Before becoming a freelance illustrator Elizabeth worked as a Designer in the Graphics Department, Television New Zealand; Designer, Illustrator in Creative Department, Illotts Advertising, Wellington.

She is now living in Auckland with her family of her husband, Hugh, and three children. She continues to illustrate for the international market. Gardening and photography are two of Elizabeth's pursuits when not illustrating.

Books illustrated
2002 The Best Dressed Bear written by Diana Noonan
2000 Apple, Banana, Cherry written by Joy Cowley
1995 The Best-Loved Bear written by Diana Noonan
1994 Song of the River written by Joy Cowley
and over 60 other picture books and readers.

Awards received
1997 Diploma of Visual Communications (Graphic Design)
1995 Aim Picture Book Award
2008 Gaelyn Gordon Award for 'A much loved book.'

References

New Zealand illustrators
New Zealand children's book illustrators
Living people
1957 births
People from Hastings, New Zealand
Artists from Auckland
New Zealand women artists
New Zealand women illustrators